Suzanne Cloutier (born 25 July 1947) is a Canadian gymnast. She competed in six events at the 1968 Summer Olympics.

References

1947 births
Living people
Canadian female artistic gymnasts
Olympic gymnasts of Canada
Gymnasts at the 1968 Summer Olympics
People from Sainte-Agathe-des-Monts
Sportspeople from Quebec
Pan American Games medalists in gymnastics
Pan American Games silver medalists for Canada
Gymnasts at the 1967 Pan American Games
Medalists at the 1967 Pan American Games
20th-century Canadian women
21st-century Canadian women